Urzi or Urzì is a surname. Notable people with the surname include:

 Agustín Urzi (born 2000), Argentinian footballer
 Daniela Urzi (born 1975), Argentinian model
 Saro Urzì (1913–1979), Italian actor